The 1896–97 Butler Christians men's basketball team represented Butler University during the 1896–97 college men's basketball season.

Schedule

|-

References

Butler Bulldogs men's basketball seasons
Butler
Butl
Butl